San Marino Unified School District is a school district located in San Marino, California. Based on API and CAASPP, it is academically the top-performing public school district in the State.

Schools
The district consists of two elementary schools (K.L. Carver Elementary School & Valentine Elementary School), one middle school (Henry E. Huntington Middle School) and one high school (San Marino High School).

History
In 1951, San Marino conducted extensive research and planning and received approval from the State Board of Education to hold an election to create the San Marino Unified School District. Voters approved San Marino's separation from South Pasadena and the creation of the new school district.

Board of Education

San Marino Unified School District's Board of Education members are elected at-large and to a four-year term. The elections are plurality and are held on a Tuesday after the first Monday in November of even-numbers years effective with the 2018 election.

Accomplishments
San Marino Unified School District ranked as the highest performing unified school district in California based on CAASPP results. San Marino Unified School District has the highest percentage of students meeting and exceeding standards on the CAASPP.

San Marino Unified School District had also ranked first for 12 consecutive years under the previous API. In 2010, San Marino Unified School District had an overall API score of 949, down from its score of 952 in 2009. San Marino High School, whose API score ranked 4th highest in the state and 1st in Los Angeles County for comprehensive high schools, posted a score of 929. Huntington Middle School posted the district's highest overall score, 971, followed by Carver Elementary, which scored 967, and Valentine Elementary, which scored 938.

References

External links

 

1951 establishments in California
School districts established in 1951
School districts in Los Angeles County, California